The R706 is a Regional Route in South Africa that connects Bloemfontein with Jagersfontein.

Route
Its north-eastern terminus is the N8 at Bloemfontein. From there, it crosses the N1, heading south-west. The route ends near Jagersfontein, at an intersection with the R704.

References 

Regional Routes in the Free State (province)